Churchill is an English surname. The Churchill family lived in Somerset in the town of Curcelle. The name Curcelle, of Norman origin, in England became confused with the name Churchill, which derives from the Old English cyrice, which means "church", and hyll, which means "hill".
Notable people with the surname include:

Family of the Dukes of Marlborough
Winston Churchill (1620–1688), English soldier and politician, father of the first Duke of Marlborough
John Churchill, 1st Duke of Marlborough (1650-1722), English general during the War of the Spanish Succession
Sarah Churchill, Duchess of Marlborough (1660-1744), Mistress of the Robes
Lord Charles Spencer-Churchill (1794–1840), soldier and Member of Parliament
Lord Randolph Churchill, son of John Winston Spencer-Churchill, 7th Duke of Marlborough, father of Winston Churchill
Jennie Jerome (Lady Randolph Churchill), mother of Winston Churchill
Winston Churchill (1874–1965), Prime Minister of the United Kingdom 
Clementine Churchill, Baroness Spencer-Churchill (1885–1977), widow of Sir Winston Churchill
Jack Churchill (1880–1947), soldier and brother of Winston Churchill
Diana Churchill, daughter of Winston Churchill
Randolph Churchill, British Conservative politician and son of Winston Churchill 
Pamela Churchill, former wife of Randolph Churchill (née Pamela Digby, later Pamela Harriman)
Sarah Churchill (actress), actress and daughter of Winston Churchill 
Marigold Churchill, daughter of Winston Churchill (died young) 
Mary Soames, Baroness Soames, daughter of Winston Churchill  
Winston Churchill (1940–2010), British Conservative politician and grandson of Winston Churchill
Arabella Churchill (charity founder) daughter of Randolph and granddaughter of Winston Churchill

Others 
Diana Churchill (actress)
 Awnsham Churchill (1658–1728), English bookseller and politician
 Caryl Churchill, British playwright
 Charles Churchill (satirist) (1732–1764), poet, author of the Rosciad
 Charles Churchill (disambiguation), multiple people
 Clive Churchill, Australian rugby league player
 Deborah Churchill (1677–1708), British pickpocket and prostitute
 Delores Churchill (born 1929) Canadian Haida traditional weaver
 Donald Churchill, English actor and writer
 Frank Churchill, American composer of popular music for films
 Graeme Churchill (born 1987), Scottish footballer
 Herman W. Churchill (1869–1941), educator, genealogist and historian
 Jack Churchill, eccentric World War II soldier
 James Paul Churchill, American judge
 Jill Churchill, American author
 Jim Churchill, American businessman and police captain
 Jo Churchill, English Conservative Party politician, Member of Parliament (MP) for Bury St Edmunds since 2015
 John C. Churchill, American politician
 John Spriggs Morss Churchill (1801–1875), English medical publisher
 Kim Churchill (born 1990), Australian folk, rock, and blues singer-songwriter and musician
 Matthew Churchill, British theatre producer
 Owen Churchill, Olympic sailor and swim fin inventor
 Odette Churchill, British spy during World War II
 Peter Churchill, British spy during World War II
 Robert W. Churchill, American lawyer and politician
 Sylvester Churchill (1783–1862), Inspector General of the US Army
 Thomas James Churchill (1824–1905) American politician, governor of Arkansas
 Tom Churchill (athlete) (1908–1963), American Olympian and standout college sports athlete
 Ward Churchill (born 1947), controversial American writer on ethnic studies
 Winston Churchill (novelist) (1871–1947), best-selling American author

References

Surnames of English origin
Surnames of Norman origin
English toponymic surnames